Jarvis John Redwine (born May 16, 1957) is a former American college and professional football player, a running back in the National Football League (NFL) for three seasons during the 1980s.  Redwine played college football for the University of Nebraska, and earned All-American honors.  He was selected in the second round of the 1981 NFL Draft, and played professionally for the NFL's Minnesota Vikings 1981 to 1983.

Born in Los Angeles, California, Redwine played high school football at Inglewood High School. He played college football at Oregon State in 1976 and 1977, then transferred to the 
University of Nebraska, where he played for head coach Tom Osborne.  His first Cornhusker season's performance as a junior in 1979 earned him Osborne's endorsement as Nebraska's best chance at a Heisman Trophy winner since Johnny Rodgers in 1972. Redwine suffered a broken rib midway through his senior season in 1980 and fell back in the Heisman race, in which he finished seventh. Even so, he was the first Cornhusker to rush for 1,000 yards in consecutive seasons, gaining 1,119.

References

External links
Sports Reference – college football statistics – Jarvis Redwine

1957 births
Living people
All-American college football players
American football running backs
Minnesota Vikings players
Nebraska Cornhuskers football players
Oregon State Beavers football players
Players of American football from Los Angeles
Inglewood High School (California) alumni